Esteban Aracama Mendiola (born February 11, 1973 in Irún) is a Spanish slalom canoer who competed from the early 1990s to the mid-2000s (decade). He finished 34th in the K-1 event at the 1996 Summer Olympics in Atlanta. Four years later in Sydney, Aracama finished in 18th place in the same event after being eliminated in the qualifying round.

References
 Sports-Reference.com profile

1973 births
Canoeists at the 1996 Summer Olympics
Canoeists at the 2000 Summer Olympics
Living people
Olympic canoeists of Spain
Spanish male canoeists
Sportspeople from Irun
Canoeists from the Basque Country (autonomous community)